Lotte Chemical Titan Holding Sdn Bhd engages in the ownership and operation of polypropylene plants, polyethylene plants, ethylene crackers, and aromatic plants. It offers high-density polyethylene (HDPE), Low-density polyethylene (LDPE), and Linear low-density polyethylene (LLDPE) for various kinds of applications, room household goods to automotives products. The company also manufactures low-density polyethylene for injection molding for cosmetic containers, bottle closures, and food containers, and is based in Pasir Gudang, Malaysia.

History
Titan Chemicals began as a joint-venture in which Datuk Chao Ting Tsung, through The Chao Group International and Permodalan Nasional Berhad (PNB), through its wholly owned subsidiary, PNB Equity Resources Corporation (PERC), have major interest.

Titan Chemicals commenced construction of its first facility in Malaysia, a RM300 million polypropylene plants, in 1989. At present, Titan Chemicals own 10 integrated process facilities in Pasir Gudang and Tanjung Langsat in the southern state of Johor which has a total nameplate production capacity of over 2.4 million tonnes annually of olefins, polyolefins and other associated products.

The company was formerly known as Titan PP Polymers (M) Sdn Bhd and changed its name to Titan Petchem (M) Sdn. Bhd. in December 2004.

Titan Chemicals Corp. Sdn. Bhd. was listed on the Main Board of Bursa Malaysia as TITAN 5103 in 2005. Its stock is included in the KL Composite Index.

In March 2006, Titan Chemicals acquired PT. TITAN Petrokimia Nusantara, Indonesia’s first and largest Polyethylene plant in the country. Situated in Merak, Indonesia, PT. TITAN adds 3 Polyethylene plants to Titan Chemicals' portfolio.

In November 2010, Titan Chemicals was acquired by Honam Petrochemical Corp.

Production facilities

Acquired by Honam Petrochemical Corp
South Korea’s Honam Petrochemical Corp has received full acceptance to take Titan Chemicals Corp private, by acquiring the remaining 27.25% shares it does not own at RM2.35 apiece. Titan shares, for which acceptance had been received by Honam after the posting date and up to 5 pm closing date on 24 December 2010, were listed as 27.25%, representing 470.89 million shares, according to Titan in a filing. On 1 November 2010, Titan received a notice of unconditional takeover offer from Honam to acquire all remaining shares (excluding treasury shares) following Honam's sale and purchase agreement in July to buy a 72.32% stake, or 1.25 billion shares, in Titan Chemicals for RM2.94 billion.

References

External links

 
 Company Overview of Lotte Chemical Titan Holding Sdn. Bhd., bloomberg.com

1989 establishments in Malaysia
Chemical companies of Malaysia
Privately held companies of Malaysia
Chemical companies established in 1989
Malaysian subsidiaries of foreign companies
Malaysian companies established in 1989